Ankeet Chavan (born 28 October 1985) is a cricketer who played for Mumbai in Indian domestic cricket. He is an all-rounder who is a left-handed batsman and slow left-arm orthodox bowler. He also played for Rajasthan Royals in Indian Premier League.

Spot fixing controversy 

On 16 May 2013, Chavan was arrested on charges of Spot fixing during IPL 6 by the Delhi police along with Ajit Chandila and Sreesanth, who played alongside him for Rajasthan Royals. According to Police, Ankeet Chavan was promised  to give away 14 runs in Rajasthan Royals' match against Mumbai Indians on 15 May 2013 and he did it giving away 15 runs in his second over.
After being arrested, he was immediately suspended by his employer, Air India.
He has been suspended from his cricketing career. Having been put in judicial custody in Tihar Central Jail, New Delhi, Chavan was granted bail from 31 May to 6 June to solemnise his marriage which had been fixed for 2 June 2013 and was granted bail on 10 June 2013 along with the other accused. On 13 September 2013, Chavan and fellow player Sreesanth were banned from cricket for life by the BCCI disciplinary committee .
On 25 July 2015, the Delhi Court gave a clean chit and discharged him of all the charges in the IPL spot fixing case.

On 16 June 2021, BCCI lifted ban on Ankeet Chavan and now he's allowed to play cricket.

References

External links 

Indian cricketers
Mumbai cricketers
Living people
1985 births
Mumbai Indians cricketers
Rajasthan Royals cricketers
Inmates of Tihar Jail
Cricketers banned for corruption